Pauta Saila  (1916 or 1917–2009) was an Inuit artist from Kilaparutua, Baffin Island, Canada who resided in Cape Dorset, Nunavut. His sister was artist Sharni Pootoogook.

His works are massive, simplified sculptures of Arctic wildlife, usually in soapstone; best known are his dancing bears.

Pauta's second wife was the Inuit artist Pitaloosie Saila.

He was elected to the Royal Canadian Academy of Arts in 2003.

Works
 Bear, at the McMichael Canadian Art Collection.

References

External links 
 Entry for Pauta Saila on the Union List of Artist Names
 Works by Saila in the National Gallery of Canada
 Pauta Saila on ArtCyclopedia

1910s births
2009 deaths
Inuit sculptors
Artists from Nunavut
People from Kinngait
Inuit from the Northwest Territories
Members of the Royal Canadian Academy of Arts
20th-century Canadian sculptors
21st-century Canadian sculptors
Inuit from Nunavut